Pasar Tono is a small town in the East Timor exclave of Oecussi-Ambeno. It is located inland from Lifau, on the Tono River. The town of Padiae lies just to the north.

References
Wheeler, T. (2004) East Timor. Footscray, VIC: Lonely Planet.

Populated places in Oecusse